Saravana Subbiah is an Indian film director and actor, who has appeared in Tamil language films. He made his directorial debut with Citizen (2001), before making the romantic drama, ABCD (2005).

Career
Saravana Subbiah made his directorial debut with Citizen (2001) featuring Ajith Kumar in the leading role of a social activist. Prior to release, the film created anticipation with reports suggesting that Ajith would portray several different get-ups in a double role. The film released in June 2001 to mixed reviews, with The Hindu labelling it as "a slow starter, but it picks up momentum after the first half and peaks to a climax, with a difference", adding that it is a "definite milestone in Ajit's acting career". The actor and director then began to work on another project titled Itihasam co-starring Simran, written by Sujatha and focusing on caste issues, but the production was shelved. He was later offered the opportunity to direct a Telugu film featuring Venkatesh and Gracy Singh titled Vaakaaladu, narrating a tale on corrupt politics, but the project was stalled. In 2002, he also briefly worked on a film titled Anthanan with Arjun for producer Navodaya Appachan, but the venture also did not develop beyond its pre-production stage.

His second film, the romantic drama ABCD was released in November 2005, with Saravana also appearing in the film as an actor in a negative role. The film won mixed reviews, with a critic noting it had a "wafer thin storyline". In 2007, he announced he had started pre-production work on a film titled Desam Kondan starring Sibiraj though it failed to progress. Similarly, he was briefly associated with a project titled Ennai Ezhanthen by Kumarappa, which was to feature Saravana in the leading role, though the film was also cancelled.

Saravana subsequently took up other roles as a supporting actor, notably appearing in Mani Ratnam's Raavanan (2010) as a cop who betrays his team and in Thambi Vettothi Sundaram (2011), where he won critical acclaim for his performance. In 2010, he worked as an anchor for the reality show Kanavu Meipadavendum on Makkal TV, which sought to hunt youngsters with managerial and leadership qualities.

Filmography

As director

As an actor

References

External links

Living people
Tamil film directors
Male actors in Tamil cinema
21st-century Indian male actors
1944 births
Tamil television directors